Robert William Cole (6 April 1869 - 12 November 1937) was born in Heston, Middlesex and studied law at Balliol, Oxford, intending to become a barrister, but instead worked as a professional photographer and author.  Some of his works are  early science fiction and future war fiction. His writing is most notable for an early description of war in space, but had little influence on the history of science fiction because it was published by small presses and received little public attention. He died in Dawlish in Devon, aged 68.

Cole's works are mostly out of print and are difficult to find.  Copies can be found at the British Library, and two have been republished in scholarly editions. They include four novels:
 The Struggle for Empire: A Story of the Year 2236 (1900)
The expanding Anglo-Saxon Empire of Earth collides with a similar empire based on Kairet, a planet of Sirius. Both empires have forgotten spiritual and philosophical values, and are driven largely by greed. Commercial rivalries soon escalate to a devastating interstellar war which results in the destruction of most of the Terran fleet, the invasion of Earth, and other disasters. The book is notable for its depiction of technology including antigravity, interplanetary radio, television, various forms of death ray, industrial transmutation, etc.  A scholarly edition edited by Richard Bleiler is available from the English publishers Pickering & Chatto as part of their 2013 "Political Future Fiction" series.
 His Other Self: The Story of a Man with a Past (1906)
A former wastrel who has found love and turned over a new leaf is intermittently possessed by his rakish past self, who does all the things that the hero no longer wants to do - drinking, chasing loose women, etc. - to teach the hero a moral lesson. Eventually, the hero is prepared to renounce his fiancée to ensure that her life will be happy, even if he is miserable. This proves that he is worthy of her, the haunting ends, and they marry.
 The Death Trap (1907)
Germany, France, and Russia go to war with Britain (the French under duress, the others willingly), destroy the British fleet, and invade southern England. Britain is nearly defeated and as profiteering, government bungling and the acts of German agents bring the country close to revolution, a heroic general is called upon to lead the country to victory. With the aid of the Japanese navy (the Japanese remembering Britain as allies from their war with Russia), the General engages the German fleet at the last moment. France switches sides just before the battle, and the enemy fleet is turned away.   Pickering & Chatto have included this book in their 2000 "British Future Fiction" series.
 The Artificial Girl (1908)
A romantic comedy; a young man disguises himself as his sister and takes her place at a ladies' finishing school, in order to pursue the woman he loves.

References

External links

British science fiction writers
Fiction set around Sirius
1869 births
1937 deaths